An electromagnetic oscillograph is an oscillograph which measures variations of electric current by having it go through a magnetic coil. Variations in current induce momentum in the coil, which can be directly measured.

The electromagnetic oscillograph was invented by William Duddell. 

Some models utilise a mirror which reflects a beam of light, allowing measurement of minute movements of the coil. Other were fitted with a hand, possibly fitted with a pen to record values.

External links 
 William du Bois Duddell
 Electromagnetic oscillograph

Measuring instruments
British inventions